Reef is a historical fiction novel written by Sri Lankan-born British author Romesh Gunesekera, first published by Granta Books in 1994. Written in English and set in Sri Lanka, it tells the story of a talented young chef named Triton who is so committed to pleasing his master, Mr. Salgado, a marine biologist obsessed with swamps and seafood, that he is oblivious to the political unrest threatening his country. It is Gunesekera's debut novel and second book, following his 1992 collection of short stories, Monkfish Moon.

It was shortlisted for the Booker Prize in 1994, but lost to How Late It Was, How Late by James Kelman amid much controversy; and the Guardian Fiction Prize the same year.

Plot
Triton is a young chef who was forced to leave his father's house to work for Mr. Ranjan Salgado, a marine biologist obsessed by swamps, sea movements, and a Sri Lankan island's disappearing reef. Almost immediately, thanks to his master's obsessions, Triton works hard to please him with his carefully prepared delicacies. But neither of them know that the political unrest threatening Sri Lanka will have a devastating influence on them, most significantly on Triton. A kind of radical uprise of violent Marxist furor is introduced through the character of Wijetunga.

Awards and nominations

Awards
1997 Premio Mondello Five Continents Asia Prize - Winner
1994 Yorkshire Post First Work Prize - Winner
1994 New Voice Award - Winner
1994 The Economist Book of the Month

Nominations
1996 International Dublin Literary Award - Longlisted
1994 Booker Prize - Shortlisted
1994 Guardian Fiction Prize - Shortlisted

References

1994 novels
Sri Lankan novels
Granta Books books